Patsiliga Creek is a stream in the U.S. state of Georgia. It is a tributary to the Flint River.

Patsiliga is a name derived from the Muskogean language meaning "pigeon roost".

References

Rivers of Georgia (U.S. state)
Rivers of Talbot County, Georgia
Rivers of Taylor County, Georgia